My Paper Heart is the major label debut album from American Christian pop rock singer Francesca Battistelli, released on July 22, 2008. The album hit No. 182 on the Billboard 200 in March 2009 and peaked at No. 35 in August 2010; it has sold over 1,000,000 copies on United States. The album was certified Gold by the RIAA on July 13, 2012.

Singles
"I'm Letting Go", was released as the lead single from the album before it released in mid-2008, and was the 16th most-played song on Christian radio of 2008.

"Free to Be Me", was released as the second single in the beginning of January 2009, and stayed at No. 1 on Christian contemporary hit radio charts for seven consecutive weeks.

"It's Your Life", was released as the third single, and peaked at No. 12 on the Hot Christian Songs chart. It was also included in the 2011 film, Soul Surfer.

"Lead Me to the Cross" was released as the fourth single from the deluxe edition of the album on iTunes on January 19, 2010. It was never released to radio stations.

"Beautiful, Beautiful" was released in February 2010 as the fifth and final single from the album.

Track listing

Personnel 
 Francesca Battistelli – lead and backing vocals
 Tim Lauer – keyboards, string arrangements (5, 7)
 Aaron Shannon – additional programming
 Mike Payne – guitars
 Tony Lucido – bass
 Scott Williamson – drums (1, 3, 5, 6, 7, 10)
 Ben Phillips – drums (2, 4, 8, 9, 11)
 David Angell – strings (5, 7)
 David Davidson – strings (5, 7)
 Kristin Wilkinson – strings (5, 7)
 Kathleen Carnalli – additional backing vocals (3, 10)

Production 
 Ian Eskelin – producer 
 Josh Bailey – executive producer 
 Barry Weeks – vocal producer, vocal recording 
 Aaron Shannon – recording 
 Matthew Barrett – recording assistant
 Mark Lacuesta – string recording (5, 7)
 J.R. McNeely – mixing 
 Steve Blackmon – mix assistant 
 Ben Phillips – additional drum editing 
 Dan Shike – mastering 
 Jason Jenkins – A&R 
 Katherine Petillo – creative director
 Ray Roper – design 
 Jeremy Cowart – photography
 Robin Geary – hair stylist, makeup 
 Samantha Roe – wardrobe
 Proper Management – management 

Studios
 Recorded at Quad Studios (Nashville, Tennessee) and The Holiday Ian (Franklin, Tennessee).
 Additional drum editing at Bletchley Park (Nashville, Tennessee).
 Mixed at Elm South Studio (Franklin, Tennessee).
 Mastered at Tone and Volume Mastering (Nashville, Tennessee).

Awards 
The album was nominated for a Dove Award for Pop/Contemporary Album of the Year at the 40th GMA Dove Awards. The song "I'm Letting Go" was also nominated for Pop/Contemporary Recorded Song of the Year.

Certifications

References 

2008 debut albums
Francesca Battistelli albums
Curb Records albums
Fervent Records albums